Andriy Medvedev defeated the defending champion Sergi Bruguera in the final, 7–5, 6–1, 6–3 to win the singles tennis title at the 1994 Monte Carlo Open.

Seeds

Draw

 ''NB: The Final was the best of 5 sets.

Finals

Top half

Section 1

Section 2

Bottom half

Section 3

Section 4

External links
 ATP singles draw

Singles